Andy Murray defeated Tommy Robredo in the final, 3–6, 7–6(9–7), 7–6(10–8) to win the singles tennis title at the 2014 Valencia Open. He saved five championship points en route to the title. This was the second final in five weeks where Murray defeated Robredo after saving championship points, having also done so at the Shenzhen Open.

Mikhail Youzhny was the defending champion, but lost to Thomaz Bellucci in the first round.

Seeds

 David Ferrer (semifinals)
 Tomáš Berdych (first round)
 Andy Murray (champion)
 Feliciano López (second round)
 John Isner (first round)
 Roberto Bautista Agut (second round, withdrew because of abdominal injury)
 Kevin Anderson (quarterfinals)
 Gilles Simon (first round)

Draw

Finals

Top half

Bottom half

Qualifying

Seeds

 Albert Ramos-Viñolas (qualified)
 Thomaz Bellucci (qualified)
 Malek Jaziri (qualified)
 Alejandro Falla (first round)
 Andreas Beck (first round)
 Peter Gojowczyk (qualifying competition)
 James Ward (qualifying competition)
 Daniel Gimeno-Traver (first round)

Qualifiers

  Albert Ramos-Viñolas
  Thomaz Bellucci
  Malek Jaziri
  Norbert Gomboš

Qualifying draw

First qualifier

Second qualifier

Third qualifier

Fourth qualifier

External links
 Main draw
 Qualifying draw

2014 Valencia Open 500